Parmouti 21 - Coptic Calendar - Parmouti 23

The twenty-second day of the Coptic month of Parmouti, the eighth month of the Coptic year. In common years, this day corresponds to April 17, of the Julian Calendar, and April 30, of the Gregorian Calendar. This day falls in the Coptic Season of Shemu, the season of the Harvest.

Commemorations

Saints 

 The departure of Pope Alexander I, 19th Patriarch of the See of Saint Mark 
 The departure of Pope Mark II, 49th Patriarch of the See of Saint Mark 
 The departure of Pope Michael II, 53rd Patriarch of the See of Saint Mark 
 The departure of Saint Isaac of Hourin

References 

Days of the Coptic calendar